The following is a list of episodes of Men in Black: The Series, an American television series that originally aired on Kids' WB. It premiered on October 11, 1997 and ended on June 30, 2001, with a total of 53 episodes over the course of 4 seasons.

Series overview

Episodes

Season 1 (1997–98)

Season 2 (1998–99)

Season 3 (1999–2000)

Season 4 (2000–01)

External links

Men in Black
Lists of American children's animated television series episodes
Men in Black (franchise)